Tell Hazna I is a Syrian archaeological site located in al-Hasakah, to the north east of Al-Hasakah, inhabited during the Early Dynastic I–II Periods, and Uruk and Ubaid periods.

Tell Hazna I 
The site has been excavated since 1988 to 2010 by the expedition of Institute of Archaeology of Russian Academy of Sciences. Tell Hazna I, is a large tell 150 m in average diameter and 17 m high. 12 m of its 16 m thick cultural deposit belong to the Early Dynastic I–II Periods, and its lower 4 m to the Uruk and Ubaid periods. The efforts of the Russian mission have been mainly concentrated on the first or upper Early Dynastic Period: the remains of the religious and administrative center.   An area of more than 2000 m2 has been uncovered on the tell's southern slope.

The site included two temple complexes (the Upper Temple and the Lower Temple), it is considered to have a pre-state organization of the community run by a religious administration.

Some clay seals were recovered during the excavations. A 3rd millennium BC kiln was also found.

See also

Tell Brak
Tell Mozan
Tell Barri
Chagar Bazar
Cities of the Ancient Near East

References
Informational notes

Citations

Bibliography

States and territories disestablished in the 3rd millennium BC
1988 archaeological discoveries
Archaeological sites in al-Hasakah Governorate
Former populated places in Syria
Brak
Ubaid period
Uruk period
Early Dynastic Period (Mesopotamia)